James Dugan may refer to:

 James Dugan (director) (1898–1937), American film director 
 James Dugan (historian) (1912–1967), American historian and writer
 James P. Dugan (1929–2021), New Jersey State Senator